Axinidris bidens is a species of ant in the genus Axinidris. Described by Shattuck in 1991, the species is endemic to the Central African Republic, Ghana and Kenya.

References

Axinidris
Hymenoptera of Africa
Insects described in 1991